Mikhail Sergeevich Smirtyukov (September 13, 1909, the Village of Govorenki, Kaluga Governorate – December 26, 2004, Moscow) was a Soviet statesman.

He became a member of the Communist Party of the Soviet Union in 1940, a member of the Central Committee (1981–1990, candidate since 1976), a member of the Central Audit Commission (1971–1976), and a member of the Supreme Council of the Soviet Union (1966–1989).

Biography

Smirtyukov was born into a peasant family, and after Lenin's death, joined the Communist Youth League in response to the Lenin Enrolment.

Between 1924 and 1927, he became the secretary of the village council, the secretary of the village cooperative, and the head of the club. In the spring of 1927, he graduated from high school.

He graduated from the faculty of Soviet Law of Moscow State University, where he studied in 1927–1931.

In October 1930, he worked in the apparatus of the Council of People's Commissars of the Soviet Union, where he started out as a senior assistant, consultant, head of sector, and Assistant Secretary of the Economic Council. He eventually became Deputy Head of the Secretariat of the Council of People's Commissars of the Union and assistant to the authorized State Defense Committee for the Supply of the Red Army Anastas Mikoyan in 1941. Smirtyukov continued to climb his way up, becoming the Deputy Head of the Secretariat of the Council of Ministers in March 1946.

Smirtyukov became the Deputy Manager of the Council of Ministers of the Soviet Union in 1953 and the managing director of the Council of Ministers of the Soviet Union in December 1964.

Among the members of the Political Bureau, he was the only one who was sent the most confidential orders of the highest governing body in the country, and the secretaries and heads of departments of the Central Committee of the Communist Party of the Soviet Union were asked to coordinate the most important plans and resolutions with him.

From July 1989, he was a personal pensioner of national importance; in 1989–1990, he was an adviser to the manager of affairs of the Council of Ministers of the Soviet Union Mikhail Shkabardnya.

He is buried in Novodevichy Cemetery (3rd section, 1st row).

Family
Wife – Smirtyukova Vera Fedorovna (1908–1980), Doctor of Medical Sciences.

Awards and commemoration
Hero of Socialist Labour (September 12, 1979);
The Four Orders of Lenin (March 7, 1943; September 12, 1969; September 12, 1979; September 12, 1984);
Order of the October Revolution (December 8, 1971);
Order of the Red Banner (August 3, 1944);
Two Orders of the Patriotic War of the 1st Degree (November 6, 1945; March 11, 1985);
Two Orders of the Red Banner of Labour (April 23, 1942; September 12, 1959);
Medals;
A plaque in the Khobulzanov alley on the house where he lived.

Compositions
Soviet State Administration Apparatus: Questions of the Organization and Activity of Central Bodies – 2nd Edition, Revised and Enlarged – Moscow: Publishing House of Political Literature, 1984 – 287 Pages

References

Sources
Smirtyukov, Mikhail Sergeevich. Site "Heroes of the Country"
Smirtyukov Mikhail Sergeevich – article from the Great Soviet Encyclopedia
Biographies
Moscow Graves. Mikhail Smirtyukov, Photography, Smirtyukov Mikhail Sergeevich (1909–2004)

1909 births
2004 deaths
Burials at Novodevichy Cemetery
Soviet jurists
Heroes of Socialist Labour
Recipients of the Order of Lenin
Recipients of the Order of the Red Banner
Recipients of the Medal of Zhukov
Soviet colonels
Central Committee of the Communist Party of the Soviet Union members
Eleventh convocation members of the Supreme Soviet of the Soviet Union
Tenth convocation members of the Supreme Soviet of the Soviet Union
Ninth convocation members of the Supreme Soviet of the Soviet Union
Eighth convocation members of the Supreme Soviet of the Soviet Union
Central Committee of the Communist Party of the Soviet Union candidate members
Seventh convocation members of the Supreme Soviet of the Soviet Union